Ramree Island (also spelled Yanbye Island) is an island off the coast of Rakhine State, Myanmar (Burma). Ramree island is the largest island in the entire Rakhine Coast and in Myanmar. In the Burmese language it is known as Yanbye Island. The district on Ramree island is Kyaukpyu district, and Kyaukpyu is a major town and the second capital of Rakhine State.

Geography 
There is a bridge over the strait connecting the island with the continental shore. There are mud volcanoes present on the island.

Nearby islands 

History 
Originally, the island was a trading post for the Kingdom of Mrauk U, with fishing villages spread across it. During World War II the Battle of Ramree Island was fought during January and February 1945, as part of the British 14th Army 1944–45 offensive on the Southern Front of the Burma campaign. At the close of the battle, Japanese soldiers were forced into the marshes surrounding the island, and saltwater crocodiles are claimed to have eaten 400 (or 980 of them, as only twenty survived according to one account) — in what the Guinness World Records has listed as "The Greatest Disaster Suffered [by humans] from Animals". However, the veracity of this story has been disputed and the facts suggest that, while a small number of Japanese soldiers were likely killed by crocodiles (the only verifiable mention is of 10-15 men killed by crocodiles while crossing the Mu River near Ramree town), the vast majority likely died due to a variety of other reasons including dehydration, drowning, British gunfire, dysentery, and perhaps even a small number to sharks (Platt et al. 1998).

Ramree was the homeland of the last ruler of Arakan, Maha Thammada.

Wildlife 
Saltwater crocodiles were still common in the Ramree Island region up and into the 1960s, but the region no longer supports a viable population of crocodiles, likely due to hide-hunting, and by the early 1980s evidence suggested only scattered individuals remained.

Pipeline 
Ramree Island is also the location of a gas pipeline system that transports oil and gas from the Indian Ocean coast to the province of Yunnan in China. From a deep water port on Kyaukphyu in Rakhine State and from Ramree Island, oil from the Middle East and gas from Myanmar's ocean coast is transported through the pipelines to China. The pipelines enable China to rely less on ocean-transported oil and gas through the treacherous Strait of Malacca and also cut two weeks off the transport time. The pipeline transport fees are a source of revenue for the Burmese government, on top of the sale of the gas. Construction began in 2011. The Myanmar section of the gas pipeline was completed on 12 June 2013 and gas started to flow to China on 21 October 2013. The oil pipeline was completed in August 2014.

See also 
 List of islands of Myanmar

References

External links 
  
 The Terrible Myth Behind Ramree Island – And The (Maybe) Real Truth 

Islands of Myanmar
World War II sites in Burma